Tobias Hager (born 13 August 1973) is a German former footballer who played as a midfielder. He played for a number of years for Bayern Munich's reserve team, before moving across town to SpVgg Unterhaching in 1996. In two years with the club, he made six appearances in the 2. Bundesliga. He was also capped three times for the Germany under-21 team in 1994.

References

External links

1973 births
Living people
German footballers
Germany under-21 international footballers
FC Bayern Munich II players
SpVgg Unterhaching players
2. Bundesliga players
Association football midfielders